The Coalition Movement (in Spanish: Movimiento Concertación) was a political party in Ecuador. Its leader was César Montúfar, who was an assemblyman for Pichincha in the 2009-2013 period.

References

External links

2007 establishments in Ecuador
2021 disestablishments in Ecuador
Centrist parties in Ecuador
Defunct liberal political parties
Defunct political parties in Ecuador
Liberal parties in Ecuador
Political parties disestablished in 2021
Political parties established in 2007